Alberto Aladje Gomes de Pina (born 22 October 1993), known as Aladje, is a Portuguese footballer who plays for Italian Serie D club Sport Club Dilettantistico Ligorna 1922 as a forward.

Club career
Born in Bissau, Guinea-Bissau to a father of Portuguese descent, Aladje started playing organised football with Calcio Padova in Italy. In summer 2012 he was acquired by Serie A club A.C. ChievoVerona, but never represented the team officially, first being loaned to F.C. Aprilia in Lega Pro Seconda Divisione.

On 8 July 2014, already owned by U.S. Sassuolo Calcio, Aladje signed with F.C. Pro Vercelli 1892 also in a temporary deal. His first and only appearance as a professional took place on 6 December of that year, when he came on as a 76th-minute substitute in a 0–4 home loss against Delfino Pescara 1936 in the Serie B.

Released by Sassuolo on 30 June 2016 without one single competitive match to his credit, Aladje continued to play in the Italian lower leagues, representing in quick succession F.C. Ponsacco 1920 SSD, Savona F.B.C. and U.S. Gavorrano. On 20 August 2019, he joined S.S.D. F.C. Messina of the Serie D; in December, he suffered a knee injury which sidelined him for several months.

International career
Aladje chose to represent Portugal internationally, first being selected to the 2013 FIFA U-20 World Cup in Turkey. He started for the national team in the group-stage opener against Nigeria, scoring in a 3–2 win. He added a further two in the next two games, with South Korea and (2–2) Cuba (5–0).

Aladje won his only cap for the under-21 side on 14 August 2013, playing 78 minutes in a 5–2 friendly victory over Switzerland.

References

External links

1993 births
Living people
Bissau-Guinean emigrants to Portugal
Portuguese sportspeople of Bissau-Guinean descent
Sportspeople from Bissau
Bissau-Guinean footballers
Portuguese footballers
Association football forwards
Serie B players
Serie C players
Serie D players
Calcio Padova players
A.C. ChievoVerona players
F.C. Aprilia Racing Club players
U.S. Sassuolo Calcio players
F.C. Pro Vercelli 1892 players
Real Vicenza V.S. players
A.C. Prato players
S.S. Ischia Isolaverde players
F.C. Ponsacco 1920 S.S.D. players
Savona F.B.C. players
U.S. Gavorrano players
A.C.R. Messina players
San Donato Tavarnelle players
Portugal youth international footballers
Portugal under-21 international footballers
Bissau-Guinean expatriate footballers
Portuguese expatriate footballers
Expatriate footballers in Italy
Portuguese expatriate sportspeople in Italy